Doors is an album by saxophonist Eric Kloss which was recorded in 1972 and first released on the Cobblestone label.

Reception

AllMusic awarded the album 3 stars.

Track listing 
All compositions by Eric Kloss.
 "Doors" - 7:28   
 "Waves" - 7:02   
 "Quasar" - 4:28   
 "Sweatin' It" - 4:59   
 "Love" - 4:55   
 "Libra" - 6:48

Personnel 
Eric Kloss - alto saxophone, tenor saxophone
Neal Creque - piano, electric piano 
Gene Taylor - bass
Ron Krasinski - drums, tambourine

References 

1972 albums
Eric Kloss albums
Cobblestone Records albums
Albums produced by Don Schlitten